George I. Cunningham was the forty-fourth mayor of Charleston, South Carolina, serving two terms from 1873 to 1877. Cunningham was born in Monroe County, Tennessee to Abner Cunningham and Celia Stephens. He served as the Chairman of the Charleston County Commissioners in 1872 and president of Charleston Waterworks Co. He was appointed a United States marshal in 1879. He was also the  postmaster of Charleston. He died on November 29, 1902, and is buried at Magnolia Cemetery. As of 2023, Cunningham is the most recent Republican mayor of Charleston.

References

American people of Scottish descent
Mayors of Charleston, South Carolina
1835 births
1902 deaths
South Carolina Republicans